Promise of Power may stand for:

 Rifts: Promise of Power game
 A sorcery card from Magic: The Gathering